Major General Charles Wake Norman CBE (13 February 1891 – September 1974) was a senior British Army officer who served in World War I and World War II and became General Officer Commanding (GOC) Aldershot District.

Military career
Charles Wake Norman was born on 13 February 1891 in Marylebone, London, England, and was educated at Eton College and then Cambridge University. Norman was commissioned as a second lieutenant into the Queen's Own West Kent Yeomanry, a Territorial Force unit, on 6 October 1910. On 20 August 1913 he transferred to the 9th Lancers. He served with the regiment when it was deployed to France, soon after the outbreak of World War I in August 1914. However, at the end of the month he was wounded and captured, and was destined to remain as a prisoner of war (POW) for the next four years, remaining in captivity at Krefeld, Germany.

After being released in 1919, he remained in the army, initially with the 9th Lancers serving around the British Empire, in India and Egypt. After marrying in 1925, he returned to England, where he became an instructor at the Royal Military College, Sandhurst. He then attended the Staff College, Camberley, from 1927 to 1928. His fellow students there included Philip Christison, Evelyn Barker, Oliver Leese, Eric Dorman-Smith, Eric Hayes, John Whiteley, Ronald Penney, John Hawkesworth, Clement West, Christopher Woolner, Robert Bridgeman and Stanley Kirby. All of these men would, like Norman himself, reach general officer rank or distinguish themselves during World War II.

He served in World War II initially as Inspector of the Royal Armoured Corps. In 1940 he was made Commander of the 1st Armoured Reconnaissance Brigade during the Battle of France and then Commander of 27th Armoured Brigade.

He was appointed General Officer Commanding (GOC) 8th Armoured Division in 1941 and GOC 10th Armoured Division in the Middle East in 1942. He went on to be GOC Aldershot District in 1944 before becoming Major-General in charge of Armoured Fighting Vehicles at Middle East Command in 1945. He retired from the army in 1946.

He lived at Bromley Common until 1946 and was appointed High Sheriff of Kent in 1947.

He was the President of Kent County Cricket Club in 1956.

References

Bibliography

External links
Generals of World War II

|-
 

|-
 

|-

 

1891 births
1974 deaths
9th Queen's Royal Lancers officers
Academics of the Royal Military College, Sandhurst
Alumni of the University of Cambridge
British Army generals of World War II
British Army personnel of World War I
British World War I prisoners of war
Commanders of the Order of the British Empire
Deputy Lieutenants of Kent
Graduates of the Staff College, Camberley
High Sheriffs of Kent
People educated at Eton College
People from Maidstone
People from Marylebone
Queen's Own West Kent Yeomanry officers
War Office personnel in World War II
World War I prisoners of war held by Germany
Military personnel from London